Henry Hope was an administrator who served as the first Lieutenant Governor of the Isle of Man.

Career
From 1773 Hope acted as Lieutenant Governor and Deputy to the Governor of the Isle of Man. He retired from the post in 1775.

References

Lieutenant Governors of the Isle of Man